Orrel Lee Thomas (May 28, 1913 – January 8, 1945), nicknamed "Little Dean", was an American Negro league pitcher in the 1930s.

A native of Mobile, Alabama, Thomas was the younger brother of fellow Negro leaguer Walter Thomas. He played for the Detroit Stars in 1937, posting a 5.63 ERA over 40 innings in six recorded appearances on the mound. Thomas died in River Rouge, Michigan in 1945 at age 31.

References

External links
 and Seamheads

1913 births
1945 deaths
Detroit Stars (1937) players
Baseball pitchers
Baseball players from Alabama
Sportspeople from Mobile, Alabama
20th-century African-American sportspeople